Salliaruseq Island (old spelling: Sagdliaruseq, translated: The-big-island) is an uninhabited island in Avannaata municipality in northwestern Greenland. At , it is one of the larger islands in the Uummannaq Fjord system, located in its central part due east of Uummannaq Island. 

Air Greenland helicopters approach Uummannaq Heliport on the way from Qaarsut Airport alongside the western wall of Salliaruseq, first converging to the island, to then turn 90 degrees to the west due to winds in the Assorput Strait.

Geography 

Salliaruseq is separated from the Uummannaq Island in the west by the Assorput Strait; from Appat Island and Saattut archipelago in the north by the central arm of Uummannaq Fjord; from the Qaqullussuit Peninsula jutting off the mainland in the east by Alaanguarqap Suullua strait; from the Ikerasak and Talerua islands in the southeast by the southern arm of the central Uummannaq Fjord, and from the Nuussuaq Peninsula in the south by the Sarqarput Strait.

It is very mountainous, with precipitous walls falling from the summit plateau (Qollortoq) to the south (Ujarassuaq), west (Innarsuaq), and north (Alaanguaraq). The highest point on the island is Inussugtalik above the northern wall. The next highest point in the vicinity of the island is the Uummannaq Mountain on the western side of the Assorput Strait.

Promontories

Photographs

References 

Uninhabited islands of Greenland
Uummannaq
Uummannaq Fjord